Empire Bruce was a prototype  cargo ship which was built in 1941 by Sir J Laing & Sons for the Ministry of War Transport (MoWT).

Description
Empire Bruce was built by Sir J Laing & Sons Ltd, Sunderland. She was yard number 737. Launched on 11 June 1941, she was completed in August 1941.

The engine was built by the Central Marine Engine Works, West Hartlepool. She had a GRT of 7,349 with a NRT of 4,497.

Career
Empire Bruce's port of registry was Sunderland. She was initially operated under the management of the Larrinaga Steamship Co Ltd. Management was then transferred to Christian Salvesen & Co Ltd, Leith.

Empire Bruce was a member of a number of convoys during the Second World War.

ON 14
Convoy ON 14 departed Liverpool on 7 September 1941 and Loch Ewe on 10 September. It dispersed at sea on 15 September. Empire Bruce was bound for Philadelphia.

Sinking
The ship was carrying a cargo of 9,141 tons of linseed from Buenos Aires, Argentina to the United Kingdom via Freetown, Sierra Leone. She capsized and sank after further torpedoes were fired at 13:51 and 14:19. The entire crew of 42, and seven DEMS gunners were rescued by minesweeper . They were landed at Freetown on 19 April.

Official Numbers and Code Letters

Official Numbers were a forerunner to IMO Numbers. Empire Bruce had the UK Official Number 168918 and used the Code Letters BCPJ.

References

1941 ships
Ships built on the River Wear
Empire ships
Ministry of War Transport ships
Steamships of the United Kingdom
Merchant ships of the United Kingdom
Maritime incidents in April 1943
Ships sunk by German submarines in World War II
World War II shipwrecks in the Atlantic Ocean